The 2019 Champion Hurdle was a horse race held at Cheltenham Racecourse on Tuesday 12 March 2019. It was the 89th running of the Champion Hurdle.

The race was won by 16/1 chance Espoir d'Allen, ridden by Mark Walsh and trained by Gavin Cromwell. Two-time winner Buveur d'Air fell at the third hurdle.

Race details
 Sponsor: Unibet
 Purse: 
 Going:Soft
 Distance:2 miles 87 yards
 Number of runners: 10
 Winner's time: 3:59.07

References

External links
2019 Champion Hurdle at the Racing Post

Champion Hurdle
 2019
Champion Hurdle
2010s in Gloucestershire
Champion Hurdle